Igreja Nova is a municipality located in the south of the Brazilian state of Alagoas. Its population is 24,586 (2020) and its area is 429 km2.

References

Municipalities in Alagoas